The Women's Time Trial at the 2013 UCI Track Cycling World Championships was held on February 21. 12 athletes participated in the contest.

Medalists

Results

The race was held at 19:00.

References

2013 UCI Track Cycling World Championships
UCI Track Cycling World Championships – Women's 500 m time trial
UCI